"So in Love" is a 1985 song by English electronic band Orchestral Manoeuvres in the Dark (OMD), released as the first single from their album Crush. It reached the top 30 of both the UK Singles Chart and the US Billboard Hot 100, becoming their first entry on the latter. The track was a top 10 hit in Belgium and Holland.

The single's artwork and its accompanying promotional video were influenced by the Mexican Day of the Dead festival.

Song history
Although "So in Love" was the first single from Crush, it was one of the last songs written for the album. It was originally dropped until band member Martin Cooper persuaded Andy McCluskey and Paul Humphreys to make a demo for the song. Andy McCluskey said it was about the painful end of a relationship. It was their first hit in the United States, after five years of trying to "break" the States, peaking at No. 26 on the Billboard Hot 100. The song reached No. 27 on the UK Singles Chart.

The single's artwork, by XL Design, and its accompanying promotional video were influenced by the Mexican Day of the Dead festival.

Single and song versions
The first approximately 50,000 copies of the 7" singles were released as a limited edition double-pack in a gatefold sleeve. There were four different 12" singles released, and one of these was also released as a picture disc. The first issue had the normal version of the song on the A-side, with an extended version of "Concrete Hands" on the B-side. Later issues included remixes of "So in Love" on the A-sides. Three remixes were made: the "Extended Version", "New Extended Version", and the "Brand New Extended Version", also known as the "Special American Dance Remix".

Critical reception and legacy
BBC Radio 2 DJ David Hamilton selected "So in Love" as his "Record of the Week", for the week of 13 May 1985. Robin Smith of Record Mirror wrote, "How can you resist a song like 'So in Love'? A misty piece of McCluskey romance tinged with sadness before showing its true claws on the chorus." Rolling Stones Paul Evans retrospectively described the track, and follow-up release "Secret", as "flawless singles". Dave Thompson of AllMusic called the song a "rich and sumptuous number" with "adamant beats, swelling synths, and dense textures". His colleague Tom Schulte identified the track – along with the following year's "If You Leave" – as the "pinnacle" of OMD's musical progression.

AFI frontman Davey Havok recalled, "I became perpetually stuck to my single speaker cassette player, fingers poised to hit record when ['So in Love'] came on the radio. Its warm croon masked cold sentiment." KROQ ranked "So in Love" the 17th-greatest song of 1985; in a poll of 6,852 Slicing Up Eyeballs readers, it was voted the 27th-best track of the year.

B-sides
"Concrete Hands" was released on the B-side of the 7" singles, and an extended version on the B-side of the 12" singles. It was also released on the Navigation: The OMD B-Sides compilation album in 2001. The lyrics were made of lines written on postcards sent by Andy McCluskey to his girlfriend.
"Maria Gallante" was an extra song on the 12" releases and can also be found on the second disc of the 7" double pack. Until now, it is not available on CD. The song takes its title from the Caribbean island Marie-Galante, although the lyrics deal with a girl.
"White Trash" is a song from the album Junk Culture. This live recording was recorded at Hammersmith Odeon on 3 October 1984, and was only released on the double 7".

Music video

The official music video for the song was directed by Andy Morahan, and filmed on-location in the Province of Almería, in Spain.
The daytime scenes were shot in the village of Alhabia
Additional scenes were filmed in the Tabernas Desert, with night scenes on city streets filmed in the capital Almería (specifically El Paseo and Cabo de Gata Avenue.)

Track listings

Charts

Weekly charts

Year-end charts

References

 Liner notes

External links
Lyrics

1985 songs
1985 singles
Music videos directed by Andy Morahan
Orchestral Manoeuvres in the Dark songs
Song recordings produced by Stephen Hague
Virgin Records singles
Songs written by Andy McCluskey
Songs written by Stephen Hague
Songs written by Paul Humphreys